Doug Molitor (born 8 July 1952) is an American television screenwriter.

He has written for TV programs including Adventure Inc., Sliders, F/X: The Series, Lucky Luke, Police Academy: The Series, You Can't Take It with You, Sledge Hammer!, Young Hercules, Ritas Welt (Rita's World), Dinosaucers, James Bond Jr. and Deepwater Black (U.S. title: Mission Genesis).

He has won the American Accolades TV & Shorts Competition for "Farewell to Tuvalu", and episode of The West Wing. and was nominated for a Humanitas Prize for his work on the Captain Planet and the Planeteers episode "The Ark".

He wrote for the Italian television series Lucky Luke. He was selected by the Writers Guild of America to participate in Writers Access Project.

In 1987 he was a four-time Jeopardy! winner and competed in the Jeopardy! Tournament of Champions, and a semifinalist in the Jeopardy! 10th Anniversary Tournament.

Television credits
 Dinosaucers (1987)
 Sledge Hammer! (1987)
 Maxie’s World (1987)
 Beverly Hills Teens (1987)
 Police Academy (1989-1990)
 The New Adventures of He-Man (1990)
 Camp Candy (1990)
 The Wizard of Oz (1990)
 Teenage Mutant Ninja Turtles (1990)
 Captain Planet and the Planeteers (1990-1992, 1994): seasons 1-3 head writer
 James Bond Jr. (1991)
 Bill & Ted’s Excellent Adventures (1991)
 Beetlejuice (1991)
 Lucky Luke (1992)
 Adventures of Sonic the Hedgehog (1993)
 All-New Dennis the Menace (1993)
 Free Willy (1994)
 Where on Earth Is Carmen Sandiego? (1994-1995, 1998-1999)
 Oscar’s Orchestra (1995)
 Mega Man (1995)
 Vor-Tech: Undercover Conversion Squad (1996)
 Hurricanes (1996)
 Dennis and Gnasher (1996)
 Billy the Cat (1997)
 Extreme Dinosaurs (1997)
 Police Academy: The Series (1997)
 F/X: The Series (1997)
 Deepwater Black (1997)
 The Fantastic Voyages of Sinbad the Sailor (1998)
 Pocket Dragon Adventures (1998)
 The New Adventures of Zorro (1998)
 Young Hercules (1998)
 Roswell Conspiracies: Aliens, Myths and Legends (1999)
 Sliders (1999)
 Sabrina: The Animated Series (1999)
 Ritas Welt (1999)
 George and Martha (2000)
 Flight Squad (2001)
 Sitting Ducks (2002)
 Totally Spies! (2002)
 X-Men: Evolution (2002)
 Adventure Inc. (2002)
 Gadget & the Gadgetinis (2003)
 Pet Alien (2005)
 Class of the Titans (2006)
 Sushi Pack (2007)
 Pucca (2008)
 The Future Is Wild (2008)
 Grossology (2008-2009)
 Shelldon (2009)
 The Penguins of Madagascar (2009)
 Hot Wheels Battle Force 5 (2010)
 Kid vs. Kat (2011)
 Transformers: Rescue Bots (2016)
 Team Zenko Go (2022)

References

External links
 

Living people
American male screenwriters
Jeopardy! contestants
American television writers
American male television writers
1952 births